Cojímar is a district in Havana, Cuba, forming a ward (consejo popular) that is part of the Habana del Este municipality. Its population is 20,390.

Overview
It was an inspiration for Ernest Hemingway's 1952 novel The Old Man and the Sea.  It was also the location where during the 1940s an enormous great white shark was caught, which is one of the contenders for the largest specimen of all time.  However, there is considerable controversy about the accuracy of great white shark measurements taken before modern times.

The Estadio Panamericano is located southwest of the village.

Notable people
 Camila Cabello - singer-songwriter
 William Levy - actor
 René Touzet y Monte - composer

References

External links

Fishing communities
Wards of Havana
Ernest Hemingway